Bulgurino is a rural locality (a khutor) in Bolshevistskoye Rural Settlement, Yelansky District, Volgograd Oblast, Russia. The population was 126 as of 2010.

Geography 
Bulgurino is located on Khopyorsko-Buzulukskaya Plain, on the left bank of the Buzuluk River, 59 km southeast of Yelan (the district's administrative centre) by road. Bolshevik is the nearest rural locality.

References 

Rural localities in Yelansky District